Xenorhabdus ehlersii  is a bacterium from the genus of Xenorhabdus which has been isolated from the nematode Steinernema serratum in China.

References

Further reading

External links
Type strain of Xenorhabdus ehlersii at BacDive -  the Bacterial Diversity Metadatabase

Bacteria described in 2005